Lysakerfjorden is an arm of the Oslofjord in Norway. It starts at the mouth of the Lysaker River, and is bordered by the peninsulas Snarøya to the west and Bygdøy to the east.

References

Fjords of Viken
Geography of Bærum
Oslofjord